Backstreet Billiards, known in Japan as , is a video game released for PlayStation. It is the sequel to the 1997 video game Carom Shot, which was released only in Japan for PlayStation. In 2008-2009, the game was re-released for the PlayStation 3 and the PlayStation Portable, followed by the PlayStation Vita release in 2012.

Development
The game was announced in May 1998.

Reception

The game received favorable reviews according to the review aggregation website GameRankings. In Japan, Famitsu gave it a score of 27 out of 40.

References

External links
 

1998 video games
ASCII Corporation games
Cue sports video games
PlayStation (console) games
PlayStation (console)-only games
Video game sequels
Video games developed in Japan